Doy is a given name and surname (see there for a list of people with the name).

DOY or DoY may refer to:
 Day of year
 Duke of York
 Duchess of York
 Department of Youth (disambiguation)
 Dongying Shengli Airport (IATA code)

See also 
 No Doy
 DOI (disambiguation)